Myanmardictyna is a genus of araneomorph spiders in the family Dictynidae, containing the single species, Myanmardictyna longifissum. It was  first described by J. Wunderlich in 2017, and is only found in Myanmar.

References

External links

Dictynidae
Monotypic Araneomorphae genera